The Mughal conquests were a series of conquests in the Indian subcontinent which led to the building of the Mughal Empire. These conquests were started by Babur in 1526, from the victory at the first battle of Panipat against Lodi dynasty. Mughals fought battles against the Safavid empire, Rajputs, Sikhs, Marathas, Ahoms and other Kingdoms.

Background

The Mughal Empire was founded by Babur (reigned 1526–1530), a Central Asian ruler who was descended from the Turco-Mongol conqueror Timur (the founder of the Timurid Empire) on his father's side, and from Genghis Khan on his mother's side, Ousted from his ancestral domains in Central Asia, Babur turned to India to satisfy his ambitions. He established himself in Kabul and then pushed steadily southward into India from Afghanistan through the Khyber Pass. Babur's forces defeated Ibrahim Lodhi in the First Battle of Panipat. However, by this time Lodhi's empire was already crumbling, and it was actually the Rajput Confederacy which was the strongest power of Northern India under the capable rule of Rana Sanga of Mewar. He defeated Babar in the Battle of Bayana. In a decisive battle fought near Agra, the Timurid forces of Babur defeated the Rajput army of Sanga In Battle of Khanwa. This battle was one of the most decisive and historic battles in Indian history, as it sealed the fate of Northern India for the next two centuries. The Mughal Empire came to its greatest extent during the reign of Aurangzeb.

Early Mughal conquests

Conquests of Akbar

Conquests of Jahangir And Shah Jahan

War of succession

Conquests of Aurangzeb

Battle During Bahadur Shah And Farukhsiyar Reign

Battle During Muhammad Shah Rangela Reign

Later Battles involving Mughals

See also
 List of wars involving the Mughal Empire
 List of battles of Rajasthan

References

Military history of India
Battles involving the Mughal Empire
Lists of wars by country
Lists of battles
Mughal Empire
India history-related lists
Indian history timelines
Indian military-related lists